Charles James O'Cahan O'Donnell (1849 – 3 December 1934) was an Irish colonial administrator in the British Raj, and later a member of the Parliament of the United Kingdom.

O'Donnell was born in Donegal in 1849. He was educated at Queens College Galway, and passed the Indian Civil Service Examinations in 1870. He served in Bengal and dealt with the famine of 1874. His duties also included tenant rights and judicial control of rents.

He was appointed assistant to the Director General of Statistics William Wilson Hunter in 1875 but returned to district work as a joint magistrate in 1884. He was the Superintendent of Bengal for the census of 1891, and rose to Commissioner in 1898 before his retirement in 1900.

O'Donnell had a palpable dislike of Lord Curzon as Viceroy of India, addressing "The Failure of Lord Curzon" to Lord Rosebery. Elected as a Liberal member for Walworth in the 1906 general election, O'Donnell levelled heavy criticism at the Secretary of State for India, for actions such as the partition of Bengal in 1905. He decided not to contest the January 1910 general election.

He was the brother of Frank Hugh O'Donnell. He married Constance Langworth in 1882. O'Donnell died at Hans Crescent, London, in December 1934.

His legacy includes the commission of the annual "O'Donnell lectures" on British or Celtic elements in the English language or the existing population of England, which are held at the universities of Edinburgh, Oxford, Aberystwyth, Bangor, Cardiff, Swansea and Lampeter (Trinity St David). The inaugural lecturer was J.R.R. Tolkien in 1954.

References

Sources

External links 

 

1849 births
1934 deaths
Liberal Party (UK) MPs for English constituencies
Irish expatriates in England
People from County Donegal
UK MPs 1906–1910
Alumni of the University of Galway
Indian Civil Service (British India) officers